Nadia Mukami (born 9 November 1996) is a Kenyan singer and songwriter known for her hit singles "Si Rahisi", and "Radio Love", featuring Arrow Bwoy. She released her debut EP, African Popstar, in October 2020. She is the founder of the Kenyan record label "Sevens Creative Hub".

Early life and education
Nadia Mukami was born in Pumwani hospital in Nairobi, Kenya on 9 November 1996. She went to Kari Mwailu Primary where she completed her Primary school studies in 2009. She was later admitted to Mount Laverna School in Kasarani, Nairobi. She later joined Maseno University and pursued a degree in BBA Finance option.

Music career
Nadia wrote and recorded her first song Barua Ya Siri in 2015. Her second song Kesi, which she released in 2017, became popular and she was invited to perform at festivals such as the Blaze The Nile Festival and The Luo Festival.

Nadia released the song "Radio Love" featuring Arrow Bwoy in February 2019. The song was her breakthrough. It garnered massive attention from the Kenyan media and was played in many radio and TV stations in the region.

In 2019, Nadia parted ways with her management "Hailemind Entertainment". In the same year 2019, her song "Radio Love" won two awards at Pulse Music Video Awards (PMVA). In 2019, she was among artistes who represented Kenya at Coke Studio Africa.

In early 2020, Nadia released "Nitekenye" featuring Kenyan Gengetone musical group "Sailors".

Nadia's debut EP was later released in October 2020. The lead single "Jipe" featuring Tanzanian singer Marioo was released in March 2020. The EP featured Khaligraph Jones, Maua Sama, Fena Gitu, DJ Joe Mfalme, Sanaipei Tande, Nigeria's Orezi, Zimbabwe's Tamy Moyo and Lioness Nam from Namibia. 
 She was also nominated for the HiPipo awards in 2020.

In 2021 she was nominated for the first time in MTV Africa Music Awards (MAMA).

Discography
Singles

Awards
Winner, Pulse Music Video Awards, Radio Love "Female Video of the Year" (2019)

Nominee, HiPipo Awards, Radio Love "Best Kenyan Act" (2020)

Nominee, MTV Africa Music Awards, "Best Fanbase Award" (2021)

Winner, Zuri Awards, Finance Category (2021)

References

1996 births
Living people
21st-century Kenyan women singers
Women songwriters